Frelon is the French word for Hornet. It may refer to:

 Frelon (material)
 Aérospatiale Super Frelon
 SNCASE SE.3200 Frelon, precursor of the Aérospatiale Super Frelon